The 1949 Oregon Webfoots football team represented the University of Oregon in the Pacific Coast Conference (PCC) during the 1949 college football season.  In their third season under head coach Jim Aiken, the Webfoots compiled a 4–6 record (2–5 against PCC opponents), finished in a tie for sixth place in the PCC, and outscored their opponents, 250 to 219. The team played its home games at Hayward Field in Eugene, Oregon.

Schedule

References

Oregon
Oregon Ducks football seasons
Oregon Webfoots football